Waverton is a suburb on the lower North Shore of Sydney, New South Wales, Australia. Waverton is 4 kilometres north of the Sydney central business district, in the local government area of North Sydney Council.

History
Waverton was named in 1929 after the Waverton Estate of an early resident, Robert Old. The land once belonged to William Carr, who named it after an English village connected to his family.

The North Shore railway line was extended south from St Leonards to Milsons Point in 1893. The station in this area for nearly forty years was known as Bay Road, after the thoroughfare that crosses the railway line. The local progress association recommended a change and Waverton was chosen in 1929.

Indigenous Australians occupied the area until 1916. They left behind numerous signs of their presence. Sites include a large rock carving of a whale adjacent to the heritage-listed Coal Loader, waterholes and grinding grooves at Balls Head Reserve, plus engravings and grinding grooves in Waverton Park.

Waverton is also home to the museum ship MV Cape Don which is berthed at the old coal loader in Balls Head Bay.

Heritage listings 
Waverton has a number of heritage-listed sites, including:
 North Shore railway: Waverton railway station
 The Coal Loader, located on the west side of the peninsula, was established from 1913 to 1917. One of the oldest coal loaders in Sydney Harbour, it was originally a steam ship bunkering station, delivering coal from the Hunter Valley to ships in the harbor. It has been restored and is a popular spot on weekends. It is heritage-listed.

Transport
Waverton railway station is on the North Shore & Western Line of the Sydney Trains network. The naval base HMAS Waterhen is located on Balls Head Road.

Commercial area

Waverton has a village-like collection of shops around the railway station, including an IGA supermarket, bottle shop, butcher, chemist and several restaurants and cafes including the Third Rail Cafe, Botanica Cafe, Bay Tandoori and Tamarind Thai. The 'Grumpy Baker' returned to Waverton late 2018 after a three-year absence, and in 2020 Capo Pizza was started.

Recreation
Balls Head Reserve, the bushland peninsula, is a popular picnic destination especially when there are harbour fireworks such as on New Year's Eve. Its one-way road system also forms part of a favoured route for walkers and joggers, and contains many adjacent bushwalking paths.

Waverton Park, on the banks of Berrys Bay, with views of Sydney Harbour, is another recreation focal point.

References

External links

  

 
Suburbs of Sydney
1929 establishments in Australia
Populated places established in 1929